Fishville is an unincorporated community in Grant Parish, Louisiana, United States.

References

External links 
 Google Maps map of Fishville

Unincorporated communities in Grant Parish, Louisiana
Unincorporated communities in Louisiana